Fibrinogen C domain containing 1 (FIBCD1) is a protein that in humans is encoded by the FIBCD1 gene localized on chromosome 9q34.1 in close proximity to the genes encoding L- and M-ficolin. FIBCD1 is thought to have a role in both host defence and gut homeostasis.

Function

FIBCD1 is a type II trans-membrane endocytic receptor that is expressed apically on enterocytes and on airway epithelial cells (Schlosser et al., 2009). It is thought to mediate the endocytosis of bound ligands which are released to the surroundings after degradation, with FIBCD1 being recycled to the plasma membrane. 

The homology between FIBCD1 and members of the ficolins, which are extensively characterised pattern-recognition molecules that have roles in the immune response, indicate FIBCD1 may have a role in host defence. Two potential phosphorylation sites in the cytoplasmic part of FIBCD1 suggest that FIBCD1 also may be a signaling protein (Schlosser et al., 2009).

Structure 
FIBCD1 forms homo-tetramers in the plasma membrane, with each protein chain consisting of a short cytoplasmic tail, a trans-membrane helix, and an ectodomain containing a coiled-coil region, a polycationic region, and a C-terminal fibrinogen-like recognition domain, otherwise known as the FReD. (Shrive, et al., 2014)

References

Further reading 

Human proteins